is a former Japanese football player.

Playing career
Uchida was born in Amagasaki on October 14, 1977. After graduating from Komazawa University, he joined J1 League club Kashima Antlers in 2000. He got opportunity to play as right and left side back from first season and the club won the champions all three major title in Japan; J1 League, J.League Cup and Emperor's Cup. The club also won the champions 2001 J1 League for 2 years in a row. From summer 2002, he became a regular player as left side back and the club won the champions 2002 J.League Cup. Although his opportunity to play decreased in 2003, he played many matches in 2004 and 2005. However he could not become a regular player. In June 2006, he moved to Albirex Niigata. He became a regular player as right side back immediately. However his opportunity to play decreased behind new member Daigo Nishi in 2010 and he could not play many matches from 2011. He retired end of 2013 season.

Club statistics

References

External links

1977 births
Living people
Komazawa University alumni
Association football people from Hyōgo Prefecture
Japanese footballers
J1 League players
Kashima Antlers players
Albirex Niigata players
Association football defenders